Delta Veicoli Speciali (En:Delta Special Vehicles) was a Turin, Italy based motor vehicle manufacturer whose only two products were the Ferves and the Yeti 4x4's.

Notes

Defunct motor vehicle manufacturers of Italy
Turin motor companies